The South Baden Cup (German: Südbadischer Pokal) is one of the 21 regional cup competitions of German football. The winner of the competition gains entry to the first round of the German Cup.

History

The Cup was established in 1945, after the end of the Second World War, in the French occupation zone in the southern half of the state of Baden, which existed as the state of South Baden from 1945 to 1952, when the state of Baden-Württemberg was formed. Due to the northern half of the state being under US occupation, the Baden football association was cut in half and a northern and southern federation was formed. The same happened with the regional cup competition.

The South Baden Cup is played annually, with the exception of 1946–47, 1951–56 and 1957–58, when it was not held.

From 1974 onwards, the winner of the South Baden Cup qualified for the first round of the German Cup.

The cup was sponsored for some years by the mineral water bottler Peterstaler and carried its name, Peterstaler Pokal, but the current sponsor is brewery Rothaus, and the competition is the therefore named Rothaus Pokal.

Modus
Professional clubs are not permitted to enter the competition, meaning, no teams from the Bundesliga and the 2. Bundesliga can compete. The only club from the region affected by this in the past years has been the first team of the SC Freiburg.

All clubs from South Baden playing in the 3. Liga (III), Regionalliga Süd (IV) and Oberliga Baden-Württemberg (V) gain direct entry to the first round. Additionally, according to a quota system, the best eight clubs from the Verbandsliga Südbaden (VI) and the three Landesligas (VII) also enter the first round directly. The four semi-finalists of the six regional cup competitions in South Baden also qualify for the competition. Should more clubs be required to make up the number of 64 set for the first round, they will be selected from the Verbandsliga.

In case of a draw, the lower-tier club advances.

Cup finals
Held annually at the end of season, these were the cup finals since 1945:

 Source: 
 Winners in bold
 1 Now FC Rastat 04
 2 Now FC Singen 04
 3 Now FC Konstanz

Winners
Listed in order of wins, the Cup winners are:

 1 Includes one win by the club's reserve team, SC Freiburg II.

References

Sources
Deutschlands Fußball in Zahlen,  An annual publication with tables and results from the Bundesliga to Verbandsliga/Landesliga, publisher: DSFS

External links
SBFV: Südbaden Football Association 
Fussball.de: South Baden Cup 

Recurring sporting events established in 1945
Football cup competitions in Germany
Football competitions in Baden-Württemberg
1945 establishments in Germany